Gudivada is a city in Krishna district of the Indian state of Andhra Pradesh. It is a municipality and the headquarters of Gudivada mandal in Gudivada revenue division. It is one of the cities in the state to be a part of Andhra Pradesh Capital Region. It is the twenty-seventh most populous city in Andhra Pradesh and the three-hundredth most populous city in India with a population of 118,167 according to the 2011 Census of India.

History 

The name Gudivada was derived from Gudi meaning Temple and Vada means Settlement or town in Telugu language. The presence of Habitation at this city may be dated back to 3rd Century BCE or 2nd Century BCE since the time of Sathavahanas as per some inscriptions. Archaeological excavations conducted at Gudivada yielded an ancient Buddhist stupa mound and Jain relics. Gudivada is religiously diversified city with many Hindu Temples and important Jain Tirth of Bhagawan Parshvanath located at market road. Vidarbhapuri was one of its earlier names.

Geography 
It is located in the Coastal Andhra region of the state. The city is located in zone 3 as per Earthquake zones of India.

Climate 
Gudivada falls in the hot, humid region of the country, and it is less than 35 miles from Bay of Bengal. The climate of the town is very hot in summer and is pleasant during the winter. The hottest day falls in the month of May with shift to June during some years.

Demographics 
 census of India, Gudivada had a population of 118,167 with 30,834 households. The total population constitute 59,062 males, 59,105 females and 10,509 in the age group of 0–6 years. It had an average literacy rate of 81.64% with 87,887 literates, significantly higher than the district average of 73.7% and the state average of 67.41%.

Government and Politics

Civic Administration 
Gudivada municipality was constituted in the year 1937 as a "third grade municipality". YSR Congress Party won the Gudivada municipal elections in 2014 and the present MLA is Kodali Sri Venkateswara Rao whereas the present chairman of the municipality is TBA. The present municipal commissioner is TBA.

Economy 

Agri based economy is the traditional base, consisting of Rice Mills, Tractor Trailer building and other supporting industries. Gudivada is a centre for service industries for the many villages around. The service industries range from Medical, Entertainment and General stores. For the last several decades, Gudivada has transformed into a good educational hub for primary, secondary and higher schools.

Transport

Public transport 
The primary modes of intra-city public transport are auto rickshaws and taxis. Apart from these, other means of transport are cars, motorcycles, cycle rickshaws, and bicycles. The Gudivada bus station and Gudivada Junction railway station are the major transport infrastructure for road and rail transport.

Road 
The national and state highways that pass through the city include, NH 165–connecting Kathipudi and Pamarru;.

Rail 
Gudivada Junction railway station is the major railway junction in Krishna district and one of the fourteen B–category stations in the Vijayawada railway division of South Coast Railway zone.

Air 
Gudivada which falls under Andhra Pradesh Capital Region is served by NTR Amaravati International airport at Gannavaram, which is just 37Km away.

Education 
The primary and secondary school education is imparted by government, aided and private schools, under the School Education Department of the state. The medium of instruction followed by different schools are English, Telugu.

The private aided colleges are, ANR college and KT Reddy women's college. There are eleven other unaided private colleges for undergraduate and postgraduate education. One-fourth of the passed out school children will enroll for college education. There are colleges for vocational courses such as, Gudivada Vocational Junior College and St.Johns Vocational Junior College; industrial training centres include, Gudivada Industrial Training Centre, Government Industrial Training Institute for Girls. It is home for Regional Research Institute for Homeopathy.

Sports 

N.T.R Stadium in the city was built in partnership with Sports Authority of Andhra Pradesh, the Sports Authority of India and the Gudivada Municipality. It is the multi-purpose stadium for several sports like, athletics, volleyball, cricket, kho kho, kabaddi, badminton, tennikoit and basketball. In January 2016, the stadium hosted the National Rural Sports and Games competition, under the Rajiv Gandhi Khel Abhiyan.

Temples 
There are six temples under the management of Endowments Department.

 Sri Bhimeswara Swamy Temple
 Sri Gowri Sankara Swamy Temple
 Sri Veeranjaneya Swamy Temple
 Sri Venkateswara Swamy Temple
 Sri Venugopala Swamy Temple
 Sri Vigneswara Swamy Temple
 Sri Kanaka Durga Temple
 Sri Kanchi Kamakshi Temple
 Sri Sri Sri Bhagavan Venkayya Swamy Aashram

See also 
 List of cities in Andhra Pradesh by population
 List of municipalities in Andhra Pradesh

References

External links 

Cities in Andhra Pradesh
Mandal headquarters in Krishna district
Cities in Andhra Pradesh Capital Region